Dr. Salieu Mohammed Turay (born 10 April 1946) is the current Ambassador Extraordinary and Plenipotentiary of the Republic of Sierra Leone to the Russian Federation.

Education and early life
He was born on the 10th of April, 1946 in Yele, Gbonkolenken Chiefdom, in Tonkolili District in the Northern Province of British Sierra Leone. Turay attended the S.D.A Primary School in Yele and then proceeded to the Government Secondary School for Boys in Magburaka, from where he graduated, acquiring the G.C.E "O-Levels" with 8 Credits, including the First Distinction 1 (one) in Biology in the History of the School. He got his A-Levels at the Prince of Wales School in Freetown in 1967. Turay then worked as a Junior Accounts Clerk at the Final Accounts Department of the Sierra Leone Ports Authority for a period of 6 months. From 1967 to 1969, he taught Biology, Chemistry, Physics and Rural Science at the St. Helena Secondary School in Freetown. To further his University Education, he moved to the USSR and attended the Schevshenko University in Kharkov, where he did One year of Russian Language Preparatory Faculty and later studied Medicine at the Lvov State Medical Institute, in 1974, he was transferred to the Philips University in Marburg, Germany, where he completed his Medical Studies and graduated with an M.D. (German equivalent).

As the current Ambassador of Sierra Leone to Russia, presenting his credentials to Russian President Dmitry Medvedev on 29 May 2009.

References

External links
 Sierra Leone Web
 
 

 mact=News,cntnt01,detail,0&cntnt01articleid=4802&cntnt01returnid=875
 

1946 births
Living people
All People's Congress politicians
Ambassadors of Sierra Leone to Russia
Ambassadors of Sierra Leone to Ukraine
Sierra Leonean Muslims
People from Tonkolili District